A bronze statue of Abraham Lincoln by George Fite Waters was installed in Portland, Oregon's South Park Blocks, in the United States, until 2020. The 10-foot statue was donated by Henry Waldo Coe.

History
The statue was cast at Claude Valsuani's foundry in France in 1927, on Lincoln's birthday, and was dedicated on October 5, 1928.

Protesters toppled the statue during the Indigenous Peoples Day of Rage in October 2020, along with the nearby Theodore Roosevelt, Rough Rider.

On July 28, 2021, Stan Pulliam, the mayor of Sandy, Oregon proposed to have the Lincoln statue, Theodore Roosevelt, Rough Rider, and the statue of George Washington reinstalled in Sandy. He said, "When we heard last week that the city of Portland is considering not putting the statues back up we decided we’re tired of the embarrassment." A decision on the future of the statues has not been made.

See also

 1928 in art
 List of monuments and memorials removed during the George Floyd protests
 List of sculptures of presidents of the United States
 List of statues of Abraham Lincoln

References

External links

 
 Abraham Lincoln at the Regional Arts & Culture Council
 Abraham Lincoln at Heritage Preservation
 Abraham Lincoln at Public Art Archive
 Abe Lincoln statue taken down for repairs in downtown Portland's South Park Blocks (photos, video) by  Mike Zacchino (March 19, 2014), The Oregonian

1928 establishments in Oregon
1928 sculptures
Bronze sculptures in Oregon
Monuments and memorials in Portland, Oregon
Monuments and memorials removed during the George Floyd protests
Monuments and memorials to Abraham Lincoln in the United States
Outdoor sculptures in Portland, Oregon
Sculptures of men in Oregon
South Park Blocks
Statues in Portland, Oregon
Portland, Oregon
Statues removed in 2020
Vandalized works of art in Oregon